Numata is a Japanese surname. Notable people with the surname include:

, Japanese basketball player
, Japanese samurai
, Japanese footballer
, Japanese footballer
, Japanese writer
, Japanese motorcycle racer
, Japanese writer
, Japanese cyclist
, Japanese actor
, Japanese boxer
, Japanese voice actor

Japanese-language surnames